El Dorado Canyon is a canyon in southern Clark County, Nevada famed for its rich silver and gold mines.  The canyon was named in 1857 by steamboat entrepreneur Captain George Alonzo Johnson when gold and silver was discovered here. It drains into the Colorado River at the former site of Nelson's Landing.

The town of Nelson lies in the upper reach of the canyon.  Eldorado Canyon Mine Tours operates mid way in the canyon at the Techatticup Mine one of the oldest and most productive mines in the canyon.

History
Prospecting and mining in the El Dorado Canyon started by 1857, if not earlier.   But in April 1861, as the American Civil War began, word got out that silver and some gold and copper lodes had been discovered by John Moss and others in what became known as El Dorado Canyon, in New Mexico Territory, now Nevada.  The canyon was on the west side of the river sixty five miles above Fort Mohave at what was then considered the limit of navigation of the river.  George A. Johnson came up river and made a deal to supply the mines with his steamboats at a lower price than that provided overland across the Mohave Desert from Los Angeles.  That fall, news of the strikes in the Colorado Mining District, (by 1864 also called the Eldorado Canyon District), brought a flood of miners to the canyon.

Several mining camps were founded in the canyon over the years.   At the beginning San Juan, or Upper Camp, was at the top of the canyon miles from the river near the modern town of Nelson.  Midway down the canyon near the Techatticup Mine were Alturas and Louisville.  At the mouth of the canyon was the boat landing of Colorado City. 

During the time of the American Civil War, three new mining camps developed in the middle canyon.  In 1862, Lucky Jim Camp was formed along Eldorado Canyon above January Wash, south of the Techatticup Mine.  Lucky Jim Camp was the home of miners sympathetic to the Confederate cause.  A mile up the canyon was a camp with Union sympathies called Buster Falls.

In late 1863, Col. John R. Vineyard, at the time a California State Senator for Los Angeles, completed a ten stamp mill the first in the canyon, on its north side just below Lucky Jim Camp, at what soon became El Dorado City.  Vineyard's mill, assembled from mill parts salvaged from abandoned works in the Mother Lode country of California, processed the ore of its mines and cut out the cost of shipping the ore out to San Francisco for such processing, cutting costs in half.  George Alonzo Johnson's steamboat company losing this downstream ore trade and making fewer trips up to the Canyon responded by raising its freight rates.

From 1865 to 1867, as part of Mohave County, Arizona Territory, El Dorado Canyon had its own post office.

In 1867, to secure the riverboat traffic and protect miners in the canyon from Paiute attacks the U.S. Army established Camp El Dorado, an outpost at the mouth of El Dorado Canyon that remained until it was abandoned in 1869.  From 1870 the mines again were active to the point where from 1879 to 1907 El Dorado Canyon again had a post office, now in Clark County, Nevada.

The mines continued to produce ore until World War II.

References

External links
  Wikimapia satellite map of Eldorado Canyon showing locations of historic mines and mining camps from wikimapia.org accessed May 24, 2015. (Note: One error in this map, is the location of Camp Duncan in El Dorado Canyon. It was located miles to the south near the historic Camp Dupont mining camp,, which was approx. 17 miles NE of Searchlight, Nevada, north of Dupont Mountain. See Avertt, Walter R. Directory of Southern Nevada Place Names. Revised edition: printed by the author, 1963, p. 20. This error derives from the erroneous location entry in the Feature Detail Report for: Camp Duncan (historical), .
Photos from El Dorado Canyon, 1880s - 1890s from The Otis Marston Colorado River Collection, Huntington Digital Library, hdl.huntington.org accessed June 22, 2015.
   Steamer "Mohave II" at El Dorado Canyon. The mill is at the left; c.1885 
  The mine operations at Eldorado Canyon served by steamer and barge, 1890. Photographer: Stanton, Robert Brewster, 1846-1922.  This is the steamboat Gila tied up at the canyon landing with a barge load of coal it brought for the stamp mill, something it did several times a year. See Lingenfelter, Steamboats of the Colorado, p. 69.
  Steamer "Gila" approaching Eldorado Canyon,  Mar. 20-21, 1890, Photographer: Stanton, Robert Brewster, 1846-1922  
  Mining operation at Eldorado Canyon, 1890. Photographer: Stanton, Robert Brewster, 1846-1922
Photos from El Dorado Canyon, 1907 from digital.library.unlv.edu, Nevada State Historical Society Photo Collection, accessed 5/12-13/2014.
  View of Southwestern Mining Company's Quartz Mill along river 
  View of Colorado River from Eldorado Canyon. Down river and towards the mill, from just below the house. (probably the mail carrier's boat in foreground)
  Abandoned mill at Eldorado Canyon 
  Eldorado Canyon from Colorado River. From a boat in mid-stream, looking west. [above] Southwestern Mining Co. Quartz Mill, Mouth of El Dorado Canyon, Boarding House, Store, Millmen's cabins, Weather Observation Station [below]  
  From the Arizona Shore, looking southwest. S.W.M. Co. Mill at outlet of El Dorado Canyon, Store building, end view, Millmen's camps and cabins on "the Mesa", abandoned adobe, home. 
  Prospectors' camp in El Dorado Canyon, 1907 
  Miners inside Techatticup Mine 
  Horse-drawn ore hauler in Eldorado Canyon 
  View of Eldorado mill in basin 
  Room and pillar surface stopes on the Wall Street Mine-which produced $1,5000,000.00 in gold alone from about 80 feet depth. El Dorado Canyon Clark County Nevada
  Dredge below Eldorado Canyon. 1907 from The Otis Marston Colorado River Collection, Huntington Digital Library, hdl.huntington.org accessed June 22, 2015.  If this is the dredge North Dakota, then the date of the photo is wrong.  It should be 1909.  It was constructed between March and June, 1909, then used from June to November, 1909, with no success.  It swamped and sank in a flood surge of the river on January 2, 1910. See Lingenfelter, Steamboats of the Colorado, p. 100.

Canyons and gorges of Nevada
Landforms of Clark County, Nevada
Mining in Nevada
History of Clark County, Nevada
1857 in Utah Territory